Daoudi is a surname. Notable people with the surname include:

El Almi Daoudi (born 1985), Algerian footballer
Lahcen Daoudi (born 1947), Moroccan politician
Mohammed Dajani Daoudi (born 1946), Palestinian professor and peace activist 
Nabil Daoudi (born 1983), Moroccan footballer
Rachid Daoudi (born 1966), Moroccan footballer